Donacaula immanis is a moth in the family Crambidae. It was described by Philipp Christoph Zeller in 1877. It is found in Bolivia and the Brazilian states of Amazonas and Rio Grande do Sul.

References

Moths described in 1877
Schoenobiinae